In Malawi, the NSN length is usually seven or nine digits.

Calling formats
To call Malawi, the following format is used: +265 1 XXX XXX or +265 X XXXX XXXX

Within Malawi dial the 7 or 9 digit subscriber number. There are no area codes.

List of allocations in Malawi
The new number plan took effect in 2009.

References

Malawi
Telecommunications in Malawi
Telephone numbers